Moldova debuted in the Junior Eurovision 2010, with their entry selected through Eurovisionul copiilor, a national selection consisting of 12 songs, organised by the Moldovan broadcaster TeleRadio-Moldova (TRM), on 25 September 2010. Ștefan Roșcovan was the winner of the selection, with the song "Ali Baba".

Before Junior Eurovision

Eurovisionul copiilor 
18 entries were submitted to TRM, which 12 were chosen to compete in the national final.

The final was filmed on 19 and 20 September 2010 and aired on 25 September 2010. Twelve songs competed and the winner was selected based on the combination of a public televote and the votes of an expert jury.

At Junior Eurovision
At the contest, Moldova finished in 8th place out of 14 countries, receiving 54 points.

Voting

Notes

References

Junior Eurovision Song Contest
Moldova
Junior